Staff College, Camberley, Surrey, was a staff college for the British Army and the presidency armies of British India (later merged to form the Indian Army). It had its origins in the Royal Military College, High Wycombe, founded in 1799, which in 1802 became the Senior Department of the new Royal Military College. In 1858 the name of the Senior Department was changed to "Staff College", and in 1870 this was separated from the Royal Military College. Apart from periods of closure during major wars, the Staff College continued to operate until 1997, when it was merged into the new Joint Services Command and Staff College. The equivalent in the Royal Navy was the Royal Naval Staff College, Greenwich, and the equivalent in the Royal Air Force was the RAF Staff College, Bracknell.

Origins

In 1799, Colonel John Le Marchant submitted a proposal to the Duke of York, the Commander-in-Chief of the Forces, for a Royal Military College. A private officer training school, based on the idea of a senior or staff department in the proposed college, was opened in the same year by Colonel Le Marchant, at the Antelope Inn, High Wycombe, and designated the Royal Military College, High Wycombe, with himself as commandant. This facility was officially recognised by royal warrant in 1801 as the senior department of the Royal Military College which was to open at a large house in 1802 in Great Marlow. Le Marchant was now appointed as Lieutenant-Governor and Superintendent-General of the College.

The course lasted for two years and in 1808 was specifically stated as intended to train future commanding officers and staff officers. Until 1858, students were required to pay to attend. The senior department of the Royal Military College moved to a building in West Street in Farnham, Surrey, in 1813 and in 1820 joined the junior department (which trained aspiring officers before they were commissioned) at Sandhurst.

Decline, independence and growth

The college underwent a decline and by 1857 the annual admissions had fallen to just six. In 1858 the name was changed to "the Staff College" and it was made independent of the Royal Military College in 1870. It now had its own commandant and adjutant, although continued to be administered by Sandhurst until 1911. Proper entry and final examinations had been introduced for the primarily military subjects taught. Purpose-built premises were approved in 1858 and built between 1859 and 1863 to a design by James Pennethorne, adjacent to the Royal Military College (but over the county boundary in Camberley). During the 1870s there were just forty students although numbers increased to sixty students in the 1880s. In 1903 officers of the colonial forces were allowed to join the college, and in 1905 naval officers were introduced.

With the threat of a second war with Germany, the college was expanded and restructured in 1938, with a junior wing at Camberley for officers of an average age of 29 years, and a senior wing at Minley Manor, Farnborough, for graduates of the school returned for further training, and aged about 35 years.

In 1994 it was announced that a new Joint Services Command and Staff College would replace the Staff College, the Royal Naval Staff College, RAF Staff College, and Joint Service Defence College in 1997.

The building is now known as Robertson House, and houses the Gurkha Brigade Association and the Army Medical Services.

Current use
The buildings were retained by the Ministry of Defence, and are used by a number of occupants, including the following:
Headquarters, Brigade of Gurkhas
Headquarters, Army Medical Services
Regimental Headquarters, Royal Army Medical Corps
Regimental Headquarters, Royal Army Dental Corps
Regimental Headquarters, Royal Army Veterinary Corps
Regimental Headquarters, Queen Alexandra's Royal Army Nursing Corps

Commandants
Commandant, Staff College, Sandhurst
1858–1861: Colonel Patrick Leonard McDougall
1861–1864: Colonel William Craig Emilius Napier
1865–1870: Colonel Thomas Edgar Lacy
Commandants since the College gained its independence in 1870 have been:
1870–1878 Major-General Edward Bruce Hamley
Feb–May 1878 Major-General Sir Archibald Alison
1878–1885 Major-General Charles Creagh-Osborne
1885–1888 Major-General Edward Clive
Commandant, Staff College, Camberley
1888–1893 Colonel Francis Clery
1893–1898 Colonel Henry Hildyard
1898–1903 Colonel Herbert Miles
1903–1906 Colonel Sir Henry Rawlinson
1907–1910 Brigadier-General Henry Wilson
1910–1913 Major-General Sir William Robertson
1913–1914 Brigadier-General Launcelot Kiggell
Note the college was closed during the War
1919–1922 Major-General Hastings Anderson
1922–1926 Major-General Sir Edmund Ironside
1926–1931 Major-General Charles Gwynn
1931–1934 Major-General John Dill
1934–1936 Major-General Clement Armitage
1936–1937 Major-General Viscount Gort
1937–1938 Major-General Sir Ronald Adam
1938–1939 Major-General Bernard Paget
1939–1941 Major-General Robert Collins
1941–1942 Major-General Montagu Stopford
1942–1943 Major-General Sir Alan Cunningham
1943–1944 Major-General Douglas Wimberley
1944–1946 Major-General Philip Gregson-Ellis
1946–1948 Major-General Richard Hull
1948–1951 Major-General Dudley Ward
1951–1954 Major-General Gerald Lathbury
1954–1956 Major-General Charles Jones
1957–1958 Major-General Nigel Poett
1958–1961 Major-General Reginald Hewetson
1961–1963 Major-General Charles Harington
1963–1966 Major-General John Worsley
1966–1967 Major-General Mervyn Butler
1967–1970 Major-General John Sharp
1970–1972 Major-General Allan Taylor
1972–1974 Major-General Patrick Howard-Dobson
1974–1975 Major-General Hugh Beach
1975–1978 Major-General John Stanier
1978–1980 Major-General Frank Kitson
1980–1982 Major-General David Alexander-Sinclair
1982–1984 Major-General John Akehurst
1984–1986 Major-General Patrick Palmer
1986–1988 Major-General John Waters
1988–1989 Major-General John Learmont
Mar–Dec 1989 Major-General Jeremy Mackenzie
1989–1991 Major-General William Rous
1991–1993 Major-General Michael Rose
1993–1994 Major-General Christopher Wallace
1994–1996 Major-General Anthony Pigott

See also
 psc (military)

References

 
Training establishments of the British Army